Nannophlebia is a genus of dragonfly in the family Libellulidae. 
They are commonly known as Archtails. The species are very small with black and yellow striped abdomens.

Species
The genus Nannophlebia includes the following species:

References

Libellulidae
Anisoptera genera
Odonata of Australia
Taxa named by Edmond de Sélys Longchamps
Insects described in 1878